Beast is an Italian anonymous contemporary street artist from Milan.

Early life
Beast is the pseudonym for an anonymous Milan-based street artist who has been active on the streets of Europe and United States since 2009, with a focus on stencils at first and later at creating digital collages aiming to highlight political and social issues.

Career
Beast created public artworks that portray well-known political figures including Donald Trump, Angela Merkel, Marine Le Pen, Matteo Renzi, Silvio Berlusconi, Matteo Salvini and Mario Draghi.

Beast uses photo manipulation technique to create his works as well as wheat pasting and billboard hijacking methods to place his works in the public sphere.

Art exhibitions

Bibliography

References

External links
 

Political artists
Pseudonymous artists
Culture jamming
Guerilla artists
Street artists
Anonymous artists
Living people
Year of birth missing (living people)
Italian graffiti artists
Italian contemporary artists